Pedrero is an elevated metro station on the Line 5 of the Santiago Metro, in Santiago, Chile. It is located close to the Estadio Monumental David Arellano. The station was opened on 5 April 1997 as part of the inaugural section of the line, from Baquedano to Bellavista de La Florida.

The station was upgraded in 2012, a work which included the lengthening of platforms and the installation of a tensile membrane roof.

References

Santiago Metro stations
Railway stations opened in 1997
Santiago Metro Line 5